Tudawali is a 1988 made for television biographical film about Aboriginal Australian actor Robert Tudawali. The screenplay was by Alan Seymour. It was directed by Steve Jodrell, and stars Ernie Dingo in the title role.

Tudawali was released on DVD by Umbrella Entertainment in July 2010. The DVD is compatible with all region codes and includes special features such as a stills gallery, press clippings, a featurette entitled Walkabout and Oondamooroo: Profile of Ernie Dingo.

References

External links
 
Tudawali at Oz Movies

1987 television films
1987 films
Films about Aboriginal Australians
Australian television films
Biographical films about actors
Special Broadcasting Service original programming
1980s English-language films